The 1989 Irish Masters was the fifteenth edition of the professional invitational snooker tournament, which took place from 28 March to 2 April 1989. The tournament was played at Goffs in Kill, County Kildare, and featured twelve professional players.

Alex Higgins won the title for the second time, beating Stephen Hendry 9–8 in the final. This was the last professional title of Higgins' career.

Main draw

References

Irish Masters
Irish Masters
Irish Masters
Irish Masters
Irish Masters